Abdallah Haybe, commonly called by various transliterations of  Agalule, was as of 2018 the president of Khatumo State. He dismissed the 2018 election of Bihi as one distorted by clannism and characterised by marginalisation of the Dhulbahante clan.

His vice president is Caano Nuug.

See also
Politics of Somalia

References

Somalian politicians
Living people
Year of birth missing (living people)